Ziniaré is a department or commune of Oubritenga Province in northern-central Burkina Faso. Its capital is the town of Ziniaré. According to the 2019 census the department has a total population of 88,299.

Towns and villages
 Ziniaré (33,301 inhabitants) (capital)
 Badnogo (515)
 Bagadogo (1,022)
 Basbedo (939)
 Barkuitenga (1,529)
 Barkoudouba (859)
 Betta (1,265)
 Bissiga Peulh (144)
 Boalin (580)
 Boulba (748)
 Gam-Silimimossé (800)
 Gombogo (642)
 Gombogo-Peulh (188)
 Gonsé (210)
 Gondogo Tandaaga (853)
 Gombogo (1,645)
 Ipala (1,417)
 Kartenga (811)
 Koada-Yarcé (483)
 Koassanga (2,551)
 Kolgondiessé (477)
 Koulgandogo (239)
 Koulgando-peulh (195)
 Ladwenda (873)
 Laongo-yanga (972)
 Matté (906)
 Moutti (1,200)
 Moyargo (618)
 Nabitenga (636)
 Nakamtenga I (749)
 Nakamtenga II (700)
 Namassa (1,105)
 Napamboubou-saalin (415)
 Ouagatenga (515)
 Oubri-Yaoghin (1,465)
 Pilaga peulh (479)
 Rassempoughin (201)
 Sawana (2,095)
 Songpélcé (2,357)
 Tanghin-Gombogo (917)
 Tanghin Goudry (528)
 Tamassa (307)
 Tamissi (959)
 Tambogo Peulh (226)
 Tampougtenga (1,007)
 Tanpoko Peulh (295)
 Taonsgo (1,609)
 Tibin (619)
 Ziga (2,392)

References

Departments of Burkina Faso
Oubritenga Province